Panj Shir (also Romanized as Panj Shīr) is a village in Jaydasht Rural District, in the Central District of Firuzabad County, Fars Province, Iran. At the 2006 census, its population was 181, in 40 families.

References 

Populated places in Firuzabad County